Tom Bentley Throckmorton (January 20, 1885, Derby, Iowa – 1961) was an American neurologist remembered for describing Throckmorton's reflex. He is also the namesake of the Throckmorton sign used in radiology.

Biography
He studied at the Jefferson Medical College, graduating M.D. in 1909 with a gold medal for the best neurological examination. He worked at the Maplewood Sanatorium, the Philadelphia Orthopedic Hospital, the Infirmary for Nervous Diseases in Philadelphia and the Cheroku State Hospital for the Insane before settling as a lecturer in neurology in Des Moines, Iowa. He was Governor of the Iowa Chapter of the American College of Physicians from 1927 to 1936.

References 

American neurologists
1885 births
1961 deaths
Thomas Jefferson University alumni